The Legend of Chu Liuxiang is a Chinese television series adapted from the three novels in the Chu Liuxiang Chuanqi segment of Gu Long's Chu Liuxiang novel series. The series was first broadcast on CCTV-8 in December 2007 in China.

Plot

Part 1: Fragrance in the Sea of Blood (血海飘香)
Chu Liuxiang is a highly skilled martial artist who steals from the rich to help the poor. Once, he attempts to steal from a courtesan who cheats unsuspecting men of their money. However, all the occupants of the brothel, including three famous martial artists, are mysteriously killed overnight by a deadly potion known as the "Heaven's One Holy Water". The potion is the secret weapon of the Holy Water Palace, a martial arts school whose members are all female. The Holy Water Palace suspects Chu Liuxiang of stealing the potion and committing the murders, so they attack him. However, Chu Liuxiang negotiates with them and they agree to give him three months to investigate the case. With help from Song Tian'er, Su Rongrong, Zhongyuan Yidianhong and others, Chu Liuxiang succeeds in clearing his name and exposing the true identity of the perpetrator, who turns out to be actually his friend Wuhua. Chu Liuxiang defeats Wuhua in a fight and Wuhua commits suicide by drinking poisoned wine.

Part 2: The Vast Desert (大沙漠)
Chu Liuxiang's adventures lead him to the desert, where he encounters his old friend Hu Tiehua. At the same time, he meets Linlang, a beautiful maiden, whom he saves from a kidnapper, and falls in love with her. However, he discovers later that Linlang is actually Shiguanyin, a mysterious and highly feared female martial artist. Shiguanyin and Wuhua (who actually survived) are behind a plot to take over the Moon City, a desert kingdom ruled by an incompetent king. With the aid of his friends, Chu Liuxiang foils Shiguanyin and Wuhua's plans and helps the king regain control of the Moon City. Chu Liuxiang defeats Shiguanyin in a fight and apparently kills her.

Part 3: The Thrush (画眉鸟)
Chu Liuxiang gets into conflict with the Holy Water Palace once more. The palace's members kidnap Song Tian'er and Hu Tiehua. The palace ruler, Shuimu Yinji, mistakes Song Tian'er for her long-lost daughter and showers her with love and care. Chu Liuxiang arrives at the palace with Li Hongxiu and Zhongyuan Yidianhong to rescue his friends, and engages Shuimu Yinji and her followers in a fight. He uncovers a plot by Liu Hongmei and Wuhua to seize the rulership of the palace. Shuimu Yinji dies as she has been poisoned by the conspirators. Song Tian'er eventually succeeds Shuimu Yinji as the ruler of the palace.

Cast

 Ken Chu as Chu Liuxiang
 Hu Jing as Su Rongrong
 Sun Feifei as Li Hongxiu
 Liu Jia as Song Tian'er
 Cui Peng as Wuhua
 Sun Xinyu as Wuhua (young)
 Benny Chan as Hu Tiehua
 Choo Ja-hyun as Shiguanyin
 Zhang Yijing as Shiguanyin (young)
 Stephanie Hsiao as Shuimu Yinji / Yu Chisu
 Kingone Wang as Zhongyuan Yidianhong
 Sammul Chan as the King of Moon City
 Mu Tingting as Liu Wumei
 Wang Jing as Gong Nanyan
 Deng Jiajia as Zhangsun Hong
 Xiu Qing as Tianfeng Shisilang
 Wang Bowen as Xue Yiren
 Wang Gang as Xue Xiaoren
 Nan Ji as Qiu Lingsu
 Tian Zhenwei as Li Yuhan
 Wang Jing as Jiao Yu
 Jin Song as Desert Fox
 Liu Yong as Xiaopan
 Wan Ni'en as Situ Jing
 Tong Tong as Cuihua
 Wu Yuejin as Lianggu
 Wang Huiqiao as Fenggu
 Shi Ting as Cai Qiao
 Yang Haiquan as Ren Ci
 Ye Erjiang as Wei Huo
 Zheng Yue as Yueya'er
 Lin Jiajun as Shuyan
 Li Qingxiang as Zhamuhe
 Guo Qiming as Ximen Qian
 Yu Jianguo as Zuo Youzheng
 Li Yuan as Bai Yumo
 Zhou Dehua as Tuying
 Zong Fengyan as Sun Xuepu
 Yuan Ming as Jin Banhua
 Xu Ming as the Shaolin abbot
 Tan Jianchang as Wuyazi
 Han Zhi as Song Gang
 Tian Zhong as Shi Tuo
 Lou Yajiang as Ping Fan
 Wang Jingluan as Wumei
 Liu Jianwei as Leng Qiuhun

Reception
CCTV reviewer Xiangshuai commented on the series's "luxurious cast" and "amazing script". She said the script captured the feeling written by Gu Long four decades ago about internal human disputes. She praised the actors and actresses for their performance, which "enhanced" the script to give viewers a sense of what the characters were feeling.

The Legend of Chu Liuxiang received honours on CCTV-8 for being the third-top rated series of 2007, as well as receiving the third-highest viewership of all television series broadcast in 2007 on CCTV-8, even though it was released in December.

International broadcast

Notes

External links
  The Legend of Chu Liuxiang official page on CCTV's website
  The Legend of Chu Liuxiang on Sina.com

Chinese wuxia television series
Works based on Chu Liuxiang (novel series)
2007 Chinese television series debuts
2007 Chinese television series endings
Mandarin-language television shows
Television shows written by Yu Zheng
Television shows based on works by Gu Long
China Central Television original programming